Gerd Gavabar (also Romanized as Gerd Gavābar and Gerd Gavāber; also known as Gerehgoabar) is a village in Otaqvar Rural District, Otaqvar District, Langarud County, Gilan Province, Iran. As of the 2006 census, its population was a total of 26 people spread across 6 families.

References 

Populated places in Langarud County